Iva Karlos Grijalva Pashova (born  1986 in Bulgaria) is a beauty pageant contestant and model from Managua, Nicaragua, her mother is a Bulgarian and father is Nicaraguan. In 2007 she was one of the 12 contestants of Supermodel Centroamérica, a spin-off from America's Next Top Model. She was crowned Miss Earth Nicaragua 2007, and competed in the Miss Earth 2007 pageant but was unplaced. In 2008 she was Nicaragua's entry in the 'World Queen of Banana' pageant held in Machala, Ecuador. Again she was unplaced.

References

External links

 Miss Nicaragua official website 
 Miss Earth official website

1986 births
Living people
People from Managua
Miss Earth 2007 contestants
Nicaraguan female models
Nicaraguan beauty pageant winners
Bulgarian emigrants to Nicaragua